Schrankia microscopica is a species of moth of the family Erebidae first described by Emilio Berio in 1962. It is found on Aldabra in the Seychelles.

References

Moths described in 1962
Hypenodinae